Šalov is a village and municipality in the Levice District in the Nitra Region of Slovakia.

History
In historical records the village was first mentioned in 1280.

Geography
The village lies at an altitude of 180 metres and covers an area of 19.045 km². It has a population of about 420 people.

Ethnicity
The village is about 73% Magyar, 20% Slovak and 7% Gypsy.

Facilities
The village has a public library and football pitch.

External links
http://www.statistics.sk/mosmis/eng/run.html

Villages and municipalities in Levice District